Balanced Worlds is a developer of a series 3D games for the web loosely titled the “Buddies” franchise.

Established in 2007, Balanced Worlds creates and distributes games to a global audience with partners in Taiwan, the United States, Southeast Asia, and China. They have offices in Beijing, China and Montreal, Quebec, Canada.

The first game in the Buddies series, Bomb Buddies, was launched on June 1, 2012. It is one of the first 3D games to be available in a player's web browser and as a downloadable client game.

In December 2012, Balanced Worlds was acquired by social gaming giant Kabam with undisclosed terms.

Background

Balanced Worlds was founded in 2007 and is owned and operated by Chris Pfeiffer, Maxim Garber, and Alexander Rivan Ronalds.

The Buddies

The Buddies franchise was conceptualized in early 2012 with the idea of bringing back classic gaming styles using a uniform series of characters and environments. The “Buddies” are meant to represent hip teens and twenties from around the world with various styling's and attitudes.

Bomb Buddies

Bomb Buddies is an action 3D free-to-play game. At launch, the title featured 8 simultaneous multiplayer mode and was one of the few synchronous games on the Facebook platform. The initial level set had over 120 levels with different themes and 6 modes to compete with other players in.

Technology

Balanced Worlds is the creator of the Equilibrium game engine which is the technology behind their 3D in the web strategy.

See also
Free-to-play
Online gaming in China
Virtual goods

References

External links
Balanced Worlds Home Page
Bomb Buddies Home Page
Bomb Buddies Facebook App
Buddies Franchise Intro Video
 Appdata - Bomb Buddies
Bomb Buddies Forums

Privately held companies of China
Video game companies of China
2007 establishments in China
Companies based in Beijing